Otluk can refer to:

 Otluk, İmamoğlu
 Otluk, Sandıklı
 Otluk, Silvan
 Otluk, Üzümlü